The Bâlta is a left tributary of the river Bistrița in Romania. It flows into the Bistrița near Telești.

Tributaries

The following rivers are tributaries to the river Bâlta (from source to mouth):

Left: Toplicioara cu Apă, Pârâul Mare, Vranița, Bătrâna
Right: Zăpodia, Dobârcina, Viteazu, Padeș

References

Rivers of Romania
Rivers of Gorj County